Shah Abdul Qadir Raipuri (1878 1962) was a scholar and reformer in the Deobandi tradition of Islam in British India and then Pakistan.

Life 
He was born in Toha Moharram Khan of Potohar of Chakwal District in British India. His father belonged to a religious Muslim Rajput family He lived with his aunt in Dhodiyal, Sargodha. She bequeathed him her lands. Her brothers were Mulana Muhammad Ahsan, Mulana Kaleemullah and Mulana Muhammad Yaseen.

He became a hafiz of the Quran under the supervision of his uncle, Maulana Kaleemullah. He learned Arabic grammar from Maulana Muhammad Rafiq, who was a student of Rashid Ahmad Gangohi. Thereafter, he left home to pursue Islamic studies. He studied in Saharanpur, Panipat and Delhi. He translated the Quran into Urdu in his later years.

In Delhi, he studied the books of hadith in Madrasa Abdur Rabb under Maulana Abd al-A’li in Delhi, who was a student of Hujjatul Islam Maulana Muhammad Qasim Nanotvi, as well as Jami' at-Tirmidhi from Anwar Shah Kashmiri. He spent 14 years with Shah Abdul Rahim Raipuri.

He was the teacher of Mustafa Raza Khan. He traveled to Bareilly in Uttar Pradesh and conducted classes on the Qur'an and hadith. He taught his disciples the methods of the purification of the soul and Tasawuff. Many Muslim scholars studied under him. He authorized some students to teach and propagate Islam across India.

References 

1962 deaths
1878 births
Deobandis
Pakistani Muslim scholars of Islam
Pakistani Islamic religious leaders
20th-century Muslim scholars of Islam
People from Chakwal District